"John Brown's Body" is an American marching song popular in the Union during the American Civil War.

John Brown's Body may also refer to:

John Brown's Body (band), American reggae band
John Brown's Body (novel), a 1969 novel by A. L. Barker
"John Brown's Body" (poem), a 1928 poem by Stephen Vincent Benét

See also
 John Brown's body, about his burial
 Battle Hymn of the Republic